Nueva Gorgona is a town and corregimiento in Chame District, Panamá Oeste Province, Panama with a population of 4,075 as of 2010. Its population as of 1990 was 1,980; its population as of 2000 was 3,140.

Nueva Gorgona is 79 km west from Panama City on the Pan American Highway (about one hour drive). It is located between the towns of Chame and Coronado, 5 minute drive from either town. Gorgona is the closest beach to Panama City. Its beaches and proximity to the city have attracted interest from developers.  Gorgona has 4.2 km long beach with  white / black sand and turquoise waters.  Gorgona possesses one of the best surfing beaches (Malibu) in the area, and a fish market. The beach is mostly calm, but can have an undertow in some areas.

References

Corregimientos of Panamá Oeste Province
Populated places in Panamá Province